The 2012 F1600 Championship Series season was the second season of the F1600 Championship Series. Matias Köykkä won the championship in the last race of the season.

Drivers and teams

Race calendar and results

Championship standings

References

External links
 Official website

F1600 Championship Series
F1600 Championship Series seasons